Noël le Chevalier Agazarian (26 December 1916 – 16 May 1941) was a British World War II fighter ace with seven victories. He was the brother of Special Operations Executive agent Jack Agazarian, who was executed by the Germans in 1945, and Monique Agazarian, pilot, author and businesswoman.

Early life
Noël Agazarian's father was Berge Agazarian (died 1944), an Armenian who arrived in the United Kingdom in 1911 as a teenager with little money. However he eventually prospered, owning a successful electrical engineering company. He married Frenchwoman Jacqueline Marie-Louise le Chevalier. They had six children, four boys (three of whom later joined the Royal Air Force) and two girls, one of whom, Monique Agazarian, later served as a pilot in the Air Transport Auxiliary. The four siblings' interest in aviation may have been sparked by their mother, who bought a World War I surplus Sopwith Pup fighter for £5 at a Croydon auction, and parked it in the back garden of the family house for use as a plaything by her children.

Noël Agazarian was schooled at Dulwich College, where he was a member of the first XV Rugby union team, captained both the swimming and boxing teams and was awarded the Victor Ludorum for sporting achievement. He then went on to Wadham College, Oxford in 1935. An earlier application to Trinity College, Oxford was rejected, allegedly because the Trinity College President, Herbert Blakiston, objected to Agazarian's ethnicity.
 At Oxford, Agazarian began his flying career with the Oxford University Air Squadron. He achieved a blue in boxing and became friends with Richard Hillary, who became well known some years later for his autobiography The Last Enemy about his time as a fighter pilot.

Hillary later wrote this description of Agazarian:

RAF service
Noël Agazarian joined the Royal Air Force as a Volunteer Reservist and was commissioned as a pilot officer on 14 February 1939. He completed his initial flying training at the same time as Richard Hillary, at RAF Lossiemouth, after which both were assigned to RAF Old Sarum, to train as army co-operation pilots. They flew Westland Lysander liaison aircraft and Hawker Hector biplanes; during the training, Agazarian crashed a Hawker Hector but was unscathed. By the time his course ended (June 1940) France had fallen, the Dunkirk evacuation had taken place and a German invasion of Britain was thought to be imminent. Because of this crisis, Hillary and Agazarian were both amongst the majority of pilots from the graduating Army co-operation class who were immediately reassigned as fighter pilots, something that pleased Agazarian immensely.

After a few weeks of fighter training, Agazarian joined 609 Squadron, a fighter squadron flying Supermarine Spitfires, based at RAF Warmwell in Dorset. It appears his victim was Gruppenkommandeur (Group Commander) Major Ernst Ott of Zerstörergeschwader 2. Ott was killed along with his gunner/radio operator. This occurred during a large battle, when a formation of German bombers and their fighter escorts were intercepted by three RAF fighter squadrons after they bombed Portsmouth and its dockyards.

Agazarian was promoted from pilot officer to flying officer on 14 August and continued to fly throughout the Battle of Britain. His last victory with 609 Squadron was on 2 December, when he shared in the destruction of a Dornier Do 17 bomber with Polish pilot Tadeusz Nowierski (in Polish). By this time he had shot down six aircraft, damaged four and shared in the destruction of three. One of the aircraft he flew during the battle, Supermarine Spitfire number R6915, still exists and is preserved in the Imperial War Museum in London. He twice made forced landings in it because of battle damage, but used it to shoot down four German aircraft and damage another.

In January 1941, Agazarian received a requested transfer to 274 Squadron in North Africa, a fighter squadron equipped with Hawker Hurricanes. On 1 May 1941, he destroyed a Messerschmitt Bf 109 over Tobruk, Libya. However, on 16 May, he was shot down and killed by Fw. Franz Elles in a Messerschmitt Bf 109 of 2./JG 27 near Gambut (Kambut), during the Commonwealth offensive known as Operation Brevity. He is buried in the Knightsbridge War Cemetery, Acroma, Libya.

Notes

References
Citations

Bibliography

 Full text at Project Gutenberg Australia

1916 births
1941 deaths
Military personnel from London
British people of Armenian descent
English people of French descent
People educated at Dulwich College
Alumni of Wadham College, Oxford
Royal Air Force officers
The Few
Armenian people of World War II
British World War II flying aces
Royal Air Force personnel killed in World War II
Aviators killed by being shot down
Royal Air Force pilots of World War II
Burials at Knightsbridge War Cemetery
Royal Air Force Volunteer Reserve personnel of World War II